"The World Is a Ghetto" is a song written and performed by War. The song was produced by Jerry Goldstein, and was featured on their 1972 album The World Is a Ghetto.

Background
The single version radio edit was less than 4 minutes. The album version, over 10 minutes long, featured a third verse, a longer intro, a saxophone solo in the instrumental section, and an extended coda featuring an electric guitar solo while War repeatedly sang the song's title before the fade.

Chart performance
It reached #3 on the U.S. R&B chart and #7 on the U.S. pop chart in 1973. It also reached the Top 40 in Canada. 
The song ranked #94 on Billboard magazine's Top 100 singles of 1973.

Certifications

Other charting versions
Will Downing released a version of the song as a single in 1991 which reached #83 on the UK Singles Chart.

Other versions
Ahmad Jamal released a version of the song as a single in 1973, but it did not chart.
Charles Kynard released a version of the song on his 1973 album Your Mama Don't Dance.
James Moody released a version of the song on his 1973 album Sax & Flute Man.
Sonny Stitt released a version of the song on his 1973 album Mr. Bojangles.
George Shearing released a version of the song on his 1974 album The Way We Are.
George Benson released a version of the song as a single in 1977, but it did not chart.
The Sax Pack released a version of the song on their 2008 album The Sax Pack.
DJ Spinna released a version of the song on his 2009 compilation album The Boogie Back: Post Disco Club Jams.
The Paragons released a version of the song on their 2015 re-release of the album On the Beach with The Paragons.
Kandace Springs released a version of the song on her 2016 album Soul Eyes.

Sampling
War's version was sampled in the 1996 song "The World Is a Ghetto" by Geto Boys on their album The Resurrection.
ASAP Mob, ASAP Nast and Method Man sampled the song of their  2013 single, Trillmatic.

References

1972 songs
1972 singles
1973 singles
1977 singles
1991 singles
Songs written by Lonnie Jordan
War (American band) songs
Will Downing songs
George Benson songs
Song recordings produced by Jerry Goldstein (producer)
United Artists Records singles
Warner Records singles